Paul A. Hanneman (July 21, 1936 – May 3, 2017) was an American politician who was a member of the Oregon House of Representatives.

Hanneman was born in Portland, Oregon and attended Portland State University. He was a businessman, owning and operating a resort and a sign company. He was also a sports fishery guide, boat builder, and owner of a commercial fishing vessel.

Hanneman died on May 3, 2017.

References

1936 births
2017 deaths
Republican Party members of the Oregon House of Representatives
Politicians from Portland, Oregon
Businesspeople from Portland, Oregon
Portland State University alumni
20th-century American businesspeople